Suez Canal Bank is an Egyptian bank, established as a joint-stock company in 1978 according to Law No. 43 (Infitah) in 1974. It is one of the oldest banks in the Egyptian private sector. The bank provides financial services to individual and corporate clients in Egypt and at its branch in Tripoli, Libya. The bank’s capital is £E2 billion, and it registered a profit of £E195 million at the end of 2015.

Shareholders
 Arab International Bank (41.48%)
 Libyan Foreign Bank (27.21%)
 Suez Canal Authority Employee Pension Fund (10.11%)
 Arab Financial Investments Company (2.50%)
 Open circulation on the Egyptian Exchange (18.20%)

History
The Suez Canal Bank was founded in 1978 in Ismailia, a city in eastern Egypt, with authorized capital of £E10 million and paid-in capital of £E2.5 million. In 1982, the company offered its initial public offering on the Egyptian Exchange. The company opened an Islamic banking branch in Dokki in 1983. In 1998, the company was upgraded to £E500 million of authorized and £E100 million of paid-in capital. The first foreign branch was opened in Tripoli in 2002. In 2007, capital was raised once more, to £E2 billion authorized and £E1 billion paid-in.

Services
The bank provides its services and financial products to individual and corporate clients through 34 branches in Egypt and Tripoli. Offerings include investment banking, trade finance, credit cards, financial services, and Islamic banking.

See also
 List of banks in Egypt

References

Egyptian brands
Banks of Egypt
Egyptian companies established in 1978
Companies listed on the Egyptian Exchange